Michael Paul (born 15 April 1961 in Hanau) is a former West German handball player who competed in the 1984 Summer Olympics.

He was a member of the West German handball team which won the silver medal. He played five matches and scored seventeen goals.

References 
 https://web.archive.org/web/20090822160121/http://mikepaul.freespaceway.com/mike.html
 

1961 births
Living people
German male handball players
Handball players at the 1984 Summer Olympics
Olympic handball players of West Germany
Olympic silver medalists for West Germany
Olympic medalists in handball
Medalists at the 1984 Summer Olympics
Sportspeople from Hanau